Whatley is a census-designated place in Clarke County, Alabama, United States. As of the 2010 census, its population was 225. It is named in honor of Franklin Benjamin Whatley. It has one site on the National Register of Historic Places, the Whatley Historic District.

History
Whatley was previously an incorporated community in 1901 and recorded a population of 187 according to the 1910 U.S. Census. It did not report any population figure again until 2010 when it became a census-designated place. During the racial violence of Red Summer of 1919 there was a gun battle between the Whatley White and Black communities on August 1, 1919, there was a Whatley, Alabama race riot. And in the same year a person named Archie Robinson got lynched.

Geography

Climate

Notable Resident 
Birthplace of Trombonist Grover Mitchell

References

Census-designated places in Clarke County, Alabama
Census-designated places in Alabama